Marakwet West is an electoral constituency in Kenya. It is one of four constituencies of Elgeyo-Marakwet County.  The constituency has six wards, all of which elect councillors for the Marakwet County Council. The constituency was established for the 1997 elections. It was  one of two constituencies in the former Marakwet District.

Members of Parliament

Polling stations

References 

Constituencies in Rift Valley Province
Constituencies in Elgeyo-Marakwet County
1997 establishments in Kenya
Constituencies established in 1997